Keef el Amar (Like The Moon) is Amal Hijazi's fifth studio album it has been released on March 31, 2008. The first video clip, "Ahla Ma Fel Eyyam", has been released in the same day. A romantic ballad song in the Egyptian dialect, the song was composed by Nour, written by Ahmed Ali Mousa and arranged by Tarek Tawakoul.

In addition  the album includes "Nefsy Tefhamny" ("I Wish You Could Understand Me"), which Hijazi released as a single in mid-2007.

Amal stated that this album will be her most diverse yet and fans have been eagerly awaiting it.

The album became a huge success throughout the Middle East and Hijazi went on tour for number of musical concerts in Egypt and in the Gulf countries.

The photograph for the album cover was taken by David Abdullah and was designed by George Yousif.

The album's first single, "Haseebak Terenn" was released in early 2008.

Track listing

Amal Hijazi albums
2008 albums